Legion of Monsters is the name of different fictional superhero teams appearing in American comic books published by Marvel Comics.

Publication history
The Legion of Monsters first appeared in Marvel Comics chronology in Marvel Premiere #28 (February 1976) and was created by Bill Mantlo, Frank Robbins, and Steve Gan.

Unrelated to the team, The Legion of Monsters was also used as a banner name for two magazines, The Legion of Monsters #1 (September 1975) and Marvel Preview #8 (September 1976), both of which featured multiple stories starring some of Marvel's monster characters.

Fictional team biography

Legion of Monsters (1976)
The first version of the Legion of Monsters were united by chance to investigate the appearance of a strange being called The Starseed. Although the being was benevolent, Morbius, the Living Vampire and the Werewolf by Night were overcome by their hungers and attacked it. The Ghost Rider intervened, as the Starseed was unable to overcome his fear of the Man-Thing and was burned by it. The dying Starseed attempted to cure the Legion of their monstrous forms, but was too weak and died minutes later. Tired of fighting, and disappointed in their actions, the team split up, although they barely acknowledged even being a team in the first place.

Legion of Monsters (2010)
A new version of the Legion of Monsters was formed by Morbius the Living Vampire, the Werewolf by Night, and the Man-Thing. They are joined by N'Kantu, the Living Mummy and the Manphibian. They came together to protect monsters from the Hunter of Monster Special Forces and send the monsters into the Morlock Tunnels to the Monster Metropolis. They first appeared when the Moloids that work for the Man-Thing find the decapitated parts of the Punisher (who was sliced up by Wolverine's son Daken) and Morbius reassembles him as FrankenCastle. The Punisher joins up with the Legion of Monsters to help protect the Monster Metropolis from the Hunter of Monster Special Forces where FrankenCastle fights the Hunter of Monster Special Forces' leader, Robert Hellsgaard.

The Werewolf by Night and N'Kantu the Living Mummy are shown fighting the Dimensional Man. Elsa Bloodstone teleported to Monster Metropolis with a dead monster that was corrupted with evil energies.

The Legion of Monsters later help the Red Hulk overcome the panicked monsters at the time when the Red Hulk had journeyed to the Monster Metropolis. With the help of Doctor Strange, the Red Hulk and the Legion of Monsters discover that the spirit that has been bothering the Red Hulk is the insane evil side of Doc Samson (referred to as Dark Samson) which has not passed into the next life. Using a ghost entrapment device, the Red Hulk and the Legion of Monsters were able destroy the Dark Samson spirit by ripping the Dark Samson spirit in half. The Red Hulk and the Legion of Monsters did a toast to honor Doc Samson after that.

Members

Legion of Monsters (1976)
 Ghost Rider - Leader
 Man-Thing
 Morbius, the Living Vampire
 Werewolf by Night

Legion of Monsters (2010)
 Werewolf by Night - Leader
 Elsa Bloodstone
 Frankenstein
 FrankenCastle - A Frankenstein version of Punisher.
 Manphibian
 Man-Thing
 N'Kantu, the Living Mummy
 Satana
 Shiklah
 Simon Garth, the Zombie

In other media
The Legion of Monsters makes a cameo in Marvel vs. Capcom 3: Fate of Two Worlds during Jill Valentine's character ending. The Legion of Monsters is seen ambushing Blade and Jill forcing the two to team up to fight them.
Three Legion of Monster members: Morbius, The Living Mummy, and Man-Thing appear in Lego Marvel Superheroes 2

Collected editions

References

External links
 Legion of Monsters at Marvel Wiki
 Legion of Monsters at Comic Vine

Marvel Comics superhero teams